A magical organization or magical order is an organization created for the practice of ceremonial or other forms of occult magic or to further the knowledge of magic among its members. Magical organizations can include Hermetic orders, Wiccan covens and circles, esoteric societies, arcane colleges, witches' covens, and other groups which may use different terminology and similar though diverse practices.

19th century
The Hermetic Brotherhood of Luxor was an initiatic occult organisation that first became public in late 1894, although according to an official document of the order it began its work in 1870. The Order's teachings drew heavily from the magico-sexual theories of Paschal Beverly Randolph, who influenced later groups such as Ordo Templi Orientis (O.T.O.), although it is not clear whether or not Randolph himself was actually a member of the Order.

The Hermetic Order of the Golden Dawn has been credited with a vast revival of occult literature and practices and was founded in 1887 or 1888 by William Wynn Westcott, Samuel Liddell MacGregor Mathers and William Robert Woodman. The teachings of the Order include ceremonial magic, Enochian magic, Christian mysticism, Qabalah, Hermeticism, the paganism of ancient Egypt, theurgy, and alchemy.

Ordo Aurum Solis, founded in 1897, is a Western mystery tradition group teaching Hermetic Qabalah. Its rituals and system are different from the more popular Golden Dawn, because the group follows the Ogdoadic Tradition instead of Rosicrucianism.

Ordo Templi Orientis (OTO) was founded by Carl Kellner in 1895.

20th century
Alpha et Omega was a continuation of the Hermetic Order of the Golden Dawn. Following a rebellion of adepts in London and an ensuing public scandal which brought the name of the Order into disrepute, Mathers renamed the branch of the Golden Dawn remaining loyal to his leadership to "Alpha et Omega" sometime between 1903 and 1913.

A∴A∴ was created in 1907 by Aleister Crowley and teaches magick and Thelema, which is a religion shared by several occult organizations. The main text of Thelema is The Book of the Law. Ordo Templi Orientis was reworked by Aleister Crowley after he took control of the Order in the early 1920s. Ecclesia Gnostica Catholica functions as the ecclesiastical arm of OTO.

Builders of the Adytum (or B.O.T.A.) was created in 1922 by Paul Foster Case and was extended by Dr. Ann Davies. It teaches Hermetic Qabalah, astrology and occult tarot.

Also in 1922, after a falling-out with Moina Mathers and with Moina's consent, Dion Fortune left the Alpha et Omega to form an offshoot organization. This indirectly brought new members to the Alpha et Omega. In 1924, Fortune's group became known as the Fraternity of the Inner Light.

Fraternitas Saturni ('Brotherhood of Saturn') is a German magical order, founded in 1926 by Eugen Grosche (also known as Gregor A. Gregorius) and four others. It is one of the oldest continuously running magical groups in Germany. The lodge is, as Gregorius states, "concerned with the study of esotericism, mysticism, and magic in the cosmic sense".

In 1954, Kenneth Grant began the work of founding the New Isis Lodge, which became operational in 1955. This became the Typhonian Ordo Templi Orientis (TOTO), which was eventually renamed to Typhonian Order.

The Church of Satan, a religious organization dedicated to Satanism as codified in The Satanic Bible, was established in 1966, by Anton LaVey, who was the Church's High Priest until his death in 1997. Church members may also participate in a system of magic which LaVey defined as greater and lesser magic. In 1975, Michael Aquino broke off from the Church of Satan and founded the Temple of Set.

The satanic and neo-nazi Order of Nine Angles (O9A or ONA) was founded in the United Kingdom during the 1970s. Hope not Hate have lobbied to have O9A designated a terrorist organization.

In 1973 John Gibbs-Bailey and  John Yeowell founded the Committee for the Restoration of the Odinic Rite or Odinist Committee in England. Yeowell had been a member of the British Union of Fascists in his youth and bodyguard to leader Oswald Mosley. In 1980 the organisation changed its name to Odinic Rite after it was believed that it had gained enough significant interest in the restoration of the Odinic faith. It is a white supremicist organization.

In 1976, James Lees founded the magical order O∴A∴A∴ in order to assist others in the pursuit of their own spiritual paths. The work of this order is based in English Qaballa.

The Sangreal Sodality is a spiritual brotherhood founded by British writer William G. Gray and Jacobus G. Swart in 1980.

During the last two decades of the 20th century, several organizations practicing chaos magic were founded. These include Illuminates of Thanateros, and Thee Temple ov Psychick Youth. These groups rely on the use of sigils. Their main texts include Liber Null (1978) and Psychonaut (1982), now published as a single book.

See also

Notes

References

Citations

Works cited

Further reading
 Contains discussion of how to distinguish a magical organization from a non-magical one.

 
Lists of organizations